= Adhya Educational Society =

Indian non-profit organization

- Founded: 2011
- Founder: Dr. Madhulika S
- Type: Education
- Purpose: Educating children who belong to the economically disadvantaged communities and underserved environments.
- Location: Hyderabad
- Region served: India
- Method: Innovative pedagogy and teaching methods based on arts, local culture, and emotional development.
- Website: adhya.org

Adhya Educational Society (AES) is an education non profit organisation based in Hyderabad, Telangana in India. Through Adhya Academy and Project Gift Compassion, AES supports and educates underprivileged children through innovative pedagogy in Science Education, Mathematics Education and Language development. Adhya participated in The Story of Light Festival in Goa from 15 to 18 January 2015.

== Project Gift Compassion ==
Project Gift Compassion is an outreach program of Adhya Educational Society. The project engages schools children, teachers and parents in exchanging a small gift prepared by a child from one strata of the society with another from a different community and background to build a bridge of compassion, hope, and trust for each other. As part of the project, 10,000 children participated in 2012 and 15,000 in 2013. For the year 2014 Project Gift Compassion is planning to reach 25,000 school children. Adhya has introduced 'Public Installation' as pedagogy through 'The Story of Light - A Spectacle' in Hyderabad on 31 January 2015.
